Tremont Row (1830s-1920s) in Boston, Massachusetts, was a short street that flourished in the 19th and early-20th centuries. It was located near the intersection of Court, Tremont, and Cambridge streets, in today's Government Center area. It existed until the 1920s, when it became known as Scollay Square.  In 1859 the Barre Gazette newspaper described Tremont Row as "the great Dry Goods Street of Boston."

Tenants

Anthony Feola Photographer
 Thomas Gold Appleton
 Austin and Stone's Dime Museum
 Thomas Ball, sculptor
 Hammatt Billings, architect
 Boston Artists' Association
 Comstock & Ross
 Cutting & Turner, photographers
 John J.P. Davis, daguerreotype artist
 Dobson & Schumann, photographers
 R.A. Dobson, photographer
 John Doggett & Co.
 Thomas Edwards (artist)
 Marguerite F. Foley, "cameo cutter" 
 E.J. Foss, photographer
 Miss Addie M. Gendron, photographer
 Frederick Gleason, publisher
 Mr. Gray, portrait artist
 Harris & Stanwood, silver
 Haven, Pierce & Co., shoes
 Josiah Johnson Hawes, photographer
 Heard & Moseley 
 John B. Heywood
 Albert Gallatin Hoit
 Charles Hubbard (artist)
 William Hudson Jr., artist
 F.A. Jones & Co. "Great Silk and Shawl House"
 Joseph Leonard, auctioneer; Leonard & Cunningham
 Leonard & Pierce
 G.H. Loomis, photographer
 Mayer's Confectionary
 Mechanic Apprentices Library Association
 Naismith Photographer
 New England Art Union
 William H. Oakes 
 Alfred Ordway
 Pavilion Hotel
 George P. Reed, publisher 
 Scollay Theatre
 Sharp & Michelin lithographers 
 Southworth & Hawes, photographers
 I.A. Wetherbee
 Merrill G. Wheelock
 Moses Wight, artist
new york dental parlors

Images

See also
 Scollay Square

References

Further reading

External links

 Bostonian Society. Photos:
 J.J. Hawes. 57-1/2 Tremont Row at Scollay Square, c. 1865
 24-28 Tremont Row at Scollay Square, c. 1880-95
 3-7 Tremont Row, c. 1908-1912
 Tremont Row, 1912
 Tremont Row, Scollay Square, c. 1960
 Theatre Comique at 14 Tremont Row, 1916
 Library of Congress:
 Sheet music published by Oakes & Swan, 8-1/2 Tremont Row, ca1840
 Sheet music lithographed by Sharp & Michelin, 17 Tremont Row, ca1840
 Sheet music published by Geo. P. Reed, 17 Tremont Row c1843

Streets in Boston
Former buildings and structures in Boston
Economic history of Boston
Government Center, Boston
19th century in Boston